Maurice Brantley (born September 19, 1968, in Kansas City, Missouri) is a professional boxer in the Middleweight division.

Pro career
Early in his career Maurice beat the veteran Reggie Strickland by a six round decision.

WBO NABO Middleweight Championship
In his first effort at a World Championship he would lose to champion Brian Barbosa in Radio City Music Hall, New York, New York; the fight was televised on HBO.

On October 17, 2003 Brantley knocked out by three-time World Champion, American Antonio Margarito and the bout was the main event on a TeleFutura fight card.

References

1968 births
Living people
American male boxers
African-American boxers
Light-middleweight boxers
Super-middleweight boxers
Middleweight boxers
Boxers from Missouri
Sportspeople from Kansas City, Missouri
21st-century African-American people
20th-century African-American sportspeople